Kirsten Edwards née Griffin (born 1991) is a New Zealand international lawn bowler.

Bowls career
Edwards won the bronze medal in the fours at the 2016 World Outdoor Bowls Championship in Christchurch with Angela Boyd, Val Smith and Katelyn Inch.

Asia Pacific
Edwards won two medals at the 2019 Asia Pacific Bowls Championships in the Gold Coast, Queensland.

National
Edwards has won four national titles at the New Zealand National Bowls Championships, all in the fours (2016, 2017, 2019, 2021) when bowling for the United and Stoke Bowls Clubs respectively. Her mother Leigh Griffin was also part of the four during the title wins.

References

Living people
New Zealand female bowls players
1991 births
20th-century New Zealand women
21st-century New Zealand women